David A. Agard is a Professor of Biochemistry and Biophysics at the University of California, San Francisco. He earned his B.S. in Molecular Biochemistry and Biophysics from Yale University and his Ph.D. in biological chemistry from California Institute of Technology. His research is focused  on understanding the basic principles of macromolecular structure and function. He is a Scientific Director of the Institute for Bioengineering, Biotechnology, and Quantitative Biomedical Research and has been a Howard Hughes Medical Institute (HHMI) investigator since 1986.

Awards 
 Member, National Academy of Sciences (USA, 2007) 
 Member, American Academy of Arts and Sciences (USA, 2009)
 Bijvoet Medal of the Bijvoet Center for Biomolecular Research of Utrecht University (Netherlands, 2018) 
 The Stein and Moore Award of the Protein Society (2021) 
 Distinguished Scientist Award of the Microscopy Society of America (2021)

References

External links 
UCSF Bio
His Howard Hughes Medical Institute bio
Agard Lab website
David Agard online seminar: Super-Resolution: Structured Illumination Microscopy (SIM)
David Agard online seminar: Deconvolution Microscopy

Living people
American biochemists
Howard Hughes Medical Investigators
Members of the United States National Academy of Sciences
University of California, San Francisco faculty
Yale College alumni
Place of birth missing (living people)
Year of birth missing (living people)
California Institute of Technology alumni
University of California, San Francisco alumni
Bijvoet Medal recipients